Nago is a city in Japan.

Nago may also refer to:

 Nago language, a dialect continuum of West Africa
 Nago-Torbole

People with the surname
 Mathurin Nago, Beninese politician
, Japanese footballer

Japanese-language surnames